'''
The Western Coastal Plains is a strip of coastal plain 50 kilometres (31 mi) in width between the west coast of India and the Western Ghats hills, which starts near the south of the Tapi River. The plains are located between the Western Ghats and the Arabian Sea. The plains begin at Gujarat in the north and end at Tamil Nadu in the south. It includes the states of Gujarat, Maharashtra, Goa, Karnataka,  Kerala,  and Tamil Nadu. The region consists of three sections: the Northern part of the coast is called the Konkan (Mumbai to Goa), the central stretch is called the Kanara or the "Karavali", while the southern stretch is referred to as the Malabar Coast. On its northern side there are two gulfs: the Gulf of Khambat and the Gulf of Kutch. The rivers along the coast form estuaries and provide conditions ideal for pisciculture. Because of the presence of less coastal land in this part, it will be affected more by the global warming.

The northern portion of the west coast is called Konkan and the southern portion Malabar. The south Malabar or Kerala coast is broken and there are some lagoons. The north Malabar Coast is known as the Karnataka coast. Here the Sharavati River, before entering the plains, descends down a 275 m high cliff and forms the Gersoppa Falls.
 
The Western Coastal Plains extend 1,500 km from Cape Comorin (Tamil Nadu) in the south to Surat (Gujarat) in north, the width ranging from 10 to 25 km from north to south, the Gujarat Plains the Konkan plains (Daman to Goa, 500 km), the Karnataka coastal plains (225 km south from Goa), and the Kerala-Tamil nadu coastal plains from Cannanore to Cape Comorin, 500 km make up the west coastal plains. The West Continental shelf is widest (350 km) off the coast of Bombay where the oil-rich Bombay High has become famous.

See also
Eastern Coastal Plains

Plains of India
Coasts of India